Trevor Alan Smith (born 6 May 1965) is a Scottish former footballer who played as a forward 
for  Dunfermline Athletic, Hamilton Academical and Kilmarnock in Scotland, and for Portadown, Glentoran, Newry Town and Crusaders in Northern Ireland.

Described by Dunfermline as a 'stalwart' at the Fife club, he won two lower division titles (1985–86 Scottish Second Division and 1988–89 Scottish First Division, plus another promotion to the top tier in 1986–87) over nine years at East End Park. In his spell at Hamilton, the club missed out on promotion in the 1991–92 season by a margin of two goals.

After moving to Northern Ireland aged 28, he was immediately involved in a dramatic battle for the league title with Portadown in 1993–94 which ended in disappointment, won the Irish Cup with Glentoran in 1996 then returned to Portadown, followed by a year at Newry and a spell at Crusaders.

His father George was also a footballer and a forward, who played mainly for Partick Thistle.

References

Living people
1965 births
Footballers from West Lothian
Scottish footballers
Kilmarnock F.C. players
Hamilton Academical F.C. players
Dunfermline Athletic F.C. players
Portadown F.C. players
Glentoran F.C. players
Newry City F.C. players
Crusaders F.C. players
Scottish Football League players
Association football forwards
NIFL Premiership players
People from Whitburn, West Lothian